Praia de Naufragados is a beach on Santa Catarina Island in Florianópolis, Santa Catarina, Brazil. The beach is 1.45 km in length and is only accessible by a 4 km walking trail.

References

Beaches of Florianópolis